The year 1774 in science and technology involved some significant events.

Astronomy
 Johann Elert Bode discovers the galaxy Messier 81.
 Lagrange publishes a paper on the motion of the nodes of a planet's orbit.

Biology
 Italian physicist Abbé Bonaventura Corti publishes Osservazioni microscopiche sulla tremella e sulla circulazione del fluido in una pianta acquajuola in Lucca, including his discovery of cyclosis in plant cells.
 French physician Antoine Parmentier publishes Examen chymique des pommes de terres in Paris, analysing the nutritional value of the potato.

Chemistry
 August 1 – Joseph Priestley, working at Bowood House, Wiltshire, England, isolates oxygen in the form of a gas, which he calls "dephlogisticated air".
 Antoine Lavoisier publishes his first book, a literature review on the composition of air, Opuscules physiques et chimiques.
 Carl Wilhelm Scheele discovers "dephlogisticated muriatic acid" (chlorine), manganese and barium.

Exploration
 Second voyage of James Cook
 June 16/17 – English explorer Captain Cook becomes the first European to sight (and name) Palmerston Island in the Pacific Ocean.
 September 4 – Cook becomes the first European to sight (and name) the island of New Caledonia in Melanesia. 
 October 10 – Cook becomes the first European to sight (and name) Norfolk Island in the Pacific Ocean, uninhabited at this date.

Mathematics
 P.-S. Laplace publishes Mémoire sur la probabilité des causes par les événements, including a restatement of Bayes' theorem.

Medicine and physiology
 William Hunter's Anatomia uteri humani gravidi tabulis illustrata | The Anatomy of the Human Gravid Uterus exhibited in figures is published by John Baskerville in Birmingham, England.
 Sugita Genpaku's Kaitai Shinsho ("New Text on Anatomy"), based on a Dutch publication, is published with illustrations in Japan, the first modern anatomy textbook produced there.

Physics
 The Schiehallion experiment is carried out by Nevil Maskelyne to determine the mean density of the Earth.

Technology
 January 27 – John Wilkinson patents a method for boring cannon from the solid, subsequently utilised for accurate boring of steam engine cylinders.
 Jesse Ramsden produces an advanced circular dividing engine with the support of the Board of Longitude.

Awards
 Copley Medal: Not awarded

Births
 April 21 – Jean-Baptiste Biot (died 1862), French physicist.
 April 24 – Jean Marc Gaspard Itard (died 1838), French otorhinolaryngologist.
 April 28 – Francis Baily (died 1844), English astronomer.
 May 7 – Francis Beaufort (died 1856), Irish-born hydrographer.
 May 28 – Edward Howard (died 1816), English chemist.
 August 18 – Meriwether Lewis (died 1809), American explorer.
 September 26 – John Chapman (died 1845), American nurseryman.
 November 12 – Charles Bell (died 1842), Scottish-born anatomist.
 December 12 – William Henry (died 1836), English chemist.

Deaths
 February 4 – Charles Marie de La Condamine, French geographer (born 1701)
 May 1 – William Hewson, English surgeon, anatomist and physiologist, "father of haematology" (born 1739)
 July 9 – Anna Morandi Manzolini, Italian anatomist (born 1714)

References

 
18th century in science
1770s in science